John Francis Carew (April 16, 1873 – April 10, 1951) was an American lawyer and politician who served eight terms as a U.S. Representative from New York from 1913 to 1929. He was a nephew of Thomas Francis Magner.

Biography 
Born in Williamsburg, Brooklyn, New York, Carew attended the public schools of Brooklyn and New York City and the College of the City of New York. He graduated from Columbia College in 1893 and from Columbia Law School in New York City in 1896. He was admitted to the bar in 1897 and thereafter practiced law in New York City. Carew was a member of the New York State Assembly (New York Co., 24th D.) in 1904. He was a delegate to the Democratic State Conventions held from 1912 to 1924, and a delegate to the 1912 and 1924 Democratic National Conventions.

Tenure in Congress 
Carew was elected as a Democrat to the Sixty-third and to the eight succeeding Congresses, holding office from March 4, 1913, until his resignation on December 28, 1929, having been appointed a justice of the New York Supreme Court.

Judicial career 
He was subsequently elected to a fourteen-year term on that court in November 1930, and served until December 31, 1943, when he reached the constitutional age limit. Thereafter, he served as an official referee for the court. Carew is best remembered as the judge who presided over the trial for custody of 10-year-old Gloria Vanderbilt in 1934.

Death 
Carew died in Rockville Centre, New York, on April 10, 1951, and was interred in Calvary Cemetery, Queens, New York.

References

External links

1873 births
1951 deaths
Columbia College (New York) alumni
Columbia Law School alumni
New York (state) lawyers
Democratic Party members of the New York State Assembly
New York (state) state court judges
Democratic Party members of the United States House of Representatives from New York (state)
People from Williamsburg, Brooklyn